William M. Appleton (August 23, 1920 – October 6, 2001) was a Republican member of the Pennsylvania House of Representatives.

References

Republican Party members of the Pennsylvania House of Representatives
1920 births
2001 deaths
Appleton family
20th-century American politicians